Delaware Coastal Airport  is a public use airport in unincorporated Sussex County, Delaware, United States. Owned by the Sussex County Council, it is located two nautical miles (4 km) southeast of the central business district of Georgetown. It is included in the Federal Aviation Administration (FAA) National Plan of Integrated Airport Systems for 2017–2021, in which it is categorized as a regional general aviation facility.

The airport is known locally by various unofficial names, including County Airport and, especially, Georgetown Airport. In mid-June 2015, the Sussex County Council voted to rename the airport from Sussex County Airport to Delaware Coastal Airport. The vote was since passed and the airport is now officially known as Delaware Coastal Airport.

Facilities and aircraft 
Delaware Coastal Airport covers an area of 615 acres (249 ha) at an elevation of 53 feet (16 m) above mean sea level. It has two runways with asphalt surfaces: 4/22 is 5,500 by 150 feet (1,676 x 46 m) and 10/28 is 3,109 by 75 feet (948 x 23 m).

For the 12-month period ending December 31, 2009, the airport had 26,000 aircraft operations, an average of 71 per day: 97.7% general aviation, 1.9% air taxi, and 0.4% military. At that time there were 62 aircraft based at this airport: 71% single-engine, 15% multi-engine, 10% helicopter, 3% jet, and 2% glider.

References

External links 

 Delaware Coastal Airport, official site
  at Delaware DOT website
 Aerial image as of March 1992 from USGS The National Map
 

Airports in Delaware
Transportation buildings and structures in Sussex County, Delaware